Dzintra is a Latvian feminine given name. The associated name day is September 4.

Notable people named Dzintra
Dzintra Blūma (born 1958), Latvian Olympic canoeist
Dzintra Grundmane (born 1944), Latvian basketball player

References 

Latvian feminine given names
Feminine given names